Isaac Ben-Israel (born  26 July 1949) is an Israeli military scientist, general, politician and state official. He currently serves as the chairman of the Israeli Space Agency and the National Council for Research and Development, under the auspices of the Ministry of Science, Technology and Space of Israel. He finished his service in the IDF ranked General, serving as head of the military Administration for the Development of Weapons and the Technological Industry. Between 2010 and 2012 he served as chief Cybernetics adviser to PM Netanyahu, during which period he founded the National Cyber Bureau in the PM office and launched the National Cyber Initiative. Ben-Israel is now head of the Security Studies program in Tel Aviv University, where he also heads the annual international Cyber Security conference. Between 2007 and 2009 he served as a member of the Knesset for Kadima. Ben-Israel is one of Israel's top experts on Space, Cyber and technological related security. He holds a PhD in Philosophy and a BSc in Physics and Mathematics from Tel Aviv University. In 2020, he declared that Covid-19 would play itself out within seventy days, regardless of intervention levels.

Biography 
Ben-Israel finished his studies at the Herzliya Hebrew High School in 1967, and was soon enlisted into the IDF under the Academic Reserve program in which he completed B.SC. in  mathematics and physics. During his military service he earned Ph.D. in philosophy from Tel-Aviv University in 1988. His last position in the IDF was as the head of the Analysis and Assessment Division of the Israeli Air Force Air Intelligence Directorate's Operations Research Branch. From 2000 to 2002, he was a member of the board of directors of Israel Aircraft Industries. He is also a member of the board of the Israel Corp.; the research and development advisory board of Teva Pharmaceutical Industries; the Fisher Institute for Air and Space Strategic Studies; the advisory council of the Technion's Neaman Institute for Advanced Studies in Science and Technology; the academic council of Tel-Aviv Academic College of Engineering; the Interdisciplinary Center for Technological Analysis and forecasting (Tel-Aviv Univ.); and the National Committee for Information Society Technology. In 2003, he founded RAY-TOP (Technology Opportunities) Ltd., a Defense consultancy firm.

In 2017, Ben-Israel was appointed to the Global Commission on the Stability of Cyberspace, and served on the commission until its successful conclusion in 2019, participating in the drafting of its eight norms related to non-aggression in cyberspace.

Support for the Nautilus MTHEL 
Ben-Israel has been a staunch supporter of —and by extension, critic of the Israeli government's failure to continue to develop and implement after United States funding was withdrawn from— the Nautilus Mobile Tactical High Energy Laser (MTHEL) to serve as a central component of the Israeli Air Defense Network against high-trajectory attacks, such as by Katyusha and Qassam rockets from Southern Lebanon and the Palestinian territories, respectively. He reiterated these arguments during the 2006 Israel-Gaza conflict and the 2006 Israel-Lebanon conflict, and called for increasing the military budget of Israel with a focus on advanced technology, including reviving the MTHEL program.

Politics 
In the 2006 Knesset elections, he was placed 31st on Kadima's list, but missed out on a seat when the party won only 29 mandates. However, after Shimon Peres resigned his seat in the Knesset to become President, Ben-Israel replaced him on 25 June 2007. He lost his seat in the February 2009 elections.

Awards 
Ben-Israel has received many awards for his contributions to Israeli defense and intelligence doctrine. He is the author of Dialogues on Science and Defense (1989) and The Philosophy of Intelligence (1999).

1972: The Israel Defense Prize — for developing a bombing system for the F-4 Phantom II
1976: The Israeli Air Force Prize — for developing a computerized control and supervision system
1984: The Head of the Intelligence Directorate Prize — "for "creative thought"
1989: Itzhak-Sade Prize for Military Literature — for his book Dialogues on Science and Defense
2001: The Israel Defense Prize — a second time, for developing weapon systems
 2002:  The Singapore Defense Technology Distinguished Award — for "outstanding contribution to bilateral defense relations between Israel and Singapore for his contribution to Defense relations between Israel and Singapore"

Further reading 

Eyal Zisser, " Israeli Policy after the Withdrawal from South Lebanon: New Realities, Old Dilemmas," Middle East Intelligence Bulletin, Vol. 2, No. 10, November 2000.
Amnon Barzilai, "U.S. Cancels Rocket Interception Weapon Deal with Israel," Globes, January 18, 2006.
Isaac Ben-Israel bio at Tel-Aviv University, "Professor Isaac Ben-Israel".
Interview with Isaac Ben-Israel, head of the Israeli Space Agency, discussing the new Israeli Satellite to spy on the Iranian nuclear program, IBA, April 26, 2006.
Ro'i Ben-Horin, "Non-Lethal Weapons Theory, Practice, and what Lies Between ," Jaffe Center for Strategic Studies (Tel Aviv Univ.), Vol. 3, No. 4, January 2001.
Isaac Ben-Israel, "Myths of pullout and terror", Haaretz, July 8, 2006.

References

External links 

1949 births
People from Tel Aviv
Herzliya Hebrew Gymnasium alumni
Israeli generals
Ariel University
Members of the 17th Knesset (2006–2009)
Living people
Kadima politicians
Israel Aerospace Industries
Tel Aviv University alumni
Commissioners of the Global Commission on the Stability of Cyberspace
Israel Defense Prize recipients